New Faces is an album by trumpeter Dizzy Gillespie recorded in 1984–85 and released on the GRP label.

Reception
Scott Yanow of  Allmusic called the album a "decent effort".

Track listing
All compositions by Dizzy Gillespie except as indicated
 "Birk's Works" - 6:26 
 "Lorraine" - 7:40 
 "Tin Tin Deo" (Gil Fuller, Gillespie, Chano Pozo) - 6:30 
 "Tenor Song" - 4:01 
 "Ballad" - 7:18 
 "Fiesta Mojo" - 6:15 
 "Every Mornin'" (Mike Longo) - 4:30

Personnel
Dizzy Gillespie - trumpet
Branford Marsalis - tenor saxophone, soprano saxophone
Kenny Kirkland - piano
Lonnie Plaxico - bass (tracks 1–6)
Lincoln Goines - bass (track 7)
Robert Ameen - drums
Steve Thornton - percussion (tracks 3 & 6)

References 

GRP Records albums
Dizzy Gillespie albums
1985 albums